Muratović (English translation: Son of Murat) is a common Bosnian surname, found throughout the former Yugoslavia and may refer to:
Alen Muratović (born 1979), Montenegrin handball player
Edvin Muratović (born 1997), Luxembourgish footballer
Emir Muratović (born 1996), Bosnian swimmer
Hasan Muratović (1940-2020), prime minister of Bosnia and Herzegovina
Mirza Muratovic (born 2000), Australian footballer of Bosnian descent
Samir Muratović (oorn 1976), Bosnian footballer
Sead Muratović (born 1979), Serbian footballer
Vedran Muratović (born 1983), Croatian footballer

Bosnian surnames
Patronymic surnames
Surnames from given names